Silja Bára Ómarsdóttir (born 1971) is an Icelandic political scientist and international relations scholar. She is Professor of Political Science at the University of Iceland. She has authored works on Icelandic foreign policy, security studies, gender and feminism. She was elected to the Icelandic Constitutional Assembly in 2010.

She was born in Ólafsfjörður, Iceland in 1971. She has a PhD from University College Cork, Ireland.

References 

Omarsdottir, Silja Bara
Omarsdottir, Silja Bara
Silja Bara Omarsdottir
Silja Bara Omarsdottir
Women political scientists